Leskovica pri Šmartnem is a settlement in the hills south of Šmartno pri Litiji in central Slovenia. The area is part of the historical region of Lower Carniola and is included in the Central Slovenia Statistical Region. It is around 25 km east of Ljubljana.

Name
The name of the settlement was changed from Leskovica to Leskovica pri Šmartnem in 1953.

References

External links
Leskovica pri Šmartnem at Geopedia

Populated places in the Municipality of Šmartno pri Litiji